Clayton Glasgow (born 10 March 1937) is a Guyanese sprinter. He competed in the men's 200 metres and men's 400 metres at the 1960 Summer Olympics.

References

1937 births
Living people
Athletes (track and field) at the 1960 Summer Olympics
Guyanese male sprinters
Olympic athletes of British Guiana
Sportspeople from Georgetown, Guyana